Eshman-e Dehgah (also Romanized as Eshmān-e Dehgāh and Eshmān Dehgāh; also known as Eshkūmdakeh, Eshkūm Dakeh, and Eshkūm Dehkā) is a village in Kiashahr Rural District, Kiashahr District, Astaneh-ye Ashrafiyeh County, Gilan Province, Iran. At the 2006 census, its population was 461, in 135 families.

References 

Populated places in Astaneh-ye Ashrafiyeh County